The Massachusetts attorney general is an elected constitutionally defined executive officer of the Massachusetts government. The officeholder is the chief lawyer and law enforcement officer of the Commonwealth of Massachusetts. The officeholder also acts as an advocate and resource for the Commonwealth and its residents in many areas, including consumer protection, combating fraud and corruption, protecting civil rights, and maintaining economic competition. The current attorney general is Andrea Campbell.

Qualifications
Any person seeking to become the attorney general of Massachusetts must meet the following requirements:
 Be at least eighteen years of age
 Be a registered voter in Massachusetts
 Be a Massachusetts resident for at least five years when elected
 Receive 10,000 signatures from registered voters on nomination papers
 Be a member of the Massachusetts Bar

History
When the 1780 state constitution was first enacted, the attorney general was appointed by the governor, with the advice and consent of the Governor's Council. The office was abolished in 1843 and re-established in 1849. In 1855 the constitution was amended so that the attorney general (along with a number of other constitutionally enumerated offices) was elected by the people. The length of the term of office has matched that of the governor, and elections are held concurrently with those for other constitutional office. Elections were first held annually, became biennial (every two years) in 1920, and quadrennial (every four years) in 1966.

Organization
The Office of the Attorney General is organized into six bureaus: Executive; Energy and Environmental; Criminal; Government; Health Care and Fair Competition; and Public Protection and Advocacy. Each bureau is divided into divisions and teams. These bureaus and divisions have distinct missions but work closely together to ensure the Attorney General's Office provides the highest level of public protection.

List of attorneys general of the Province of Massachusetts Bay
Office established at the start of Queen Anne's War in 1702.

List of attorneys general of the Commonwealth of Massachusetts
Office reestablished upon the ratification of the Constitution of Massachusetts in 1780.

References

External links
 Massachusetts Attorney General official website
 . (Various documents).
 Massachusetts Attorney General articles at ABA Journal
 News and Commentary at FindLaw
 Massachusetts General Laws at Law.Justia.com
 U.S. Supreme Court Opinions - "Cases with title containing: State of Massachusetts" at FindLaw
 Massachusetts Bar Association
 Massachusetts Attorney General Maura Healey profile at National Association of Attorneys General
 Press releases at Massachusetts Attorney General

 
Attorneys General
1702 establishments in Massachusetts